The 1925 New Mexico Lobos football team was an American football team that represented the University of New Mexico as an independent during the 1925 college football season. In its sixth season under head coach Roy W. Johnson, the team compiled a 2–4–1 record. Hearst Coen was the team captain.

Schedule

References

New Mexico
New Mexico Lobos football seasons
New Mexico Lobos football